HotHardware is an online publication about computer hardware, consumer electronics and related technologies, mobile computing and PC gaming.  It regularly features coverage of new products and technologies from vendors including Intel, Dell, AMD, and NVIDIA. "Daily Hardware Round-ups" also offer reviews and news submitted by other technology-related sites.

Content is organized by category and is searchable through a content management system (CMS), with a blog-style comments section for registered users, and a web forum with integrated comments section, topic tagging/filing and a content rating system. Forum members can also take part in contests to win hardware that has been featured on the site.

References

External links
 
 

Computing websites
Internet properties established in 1999
1999 establishments in the United States